Trapezoid is an American folk music group led by Paul Reisler.  Founded in 1975 by Sam Rizzetta and Reisler, they began as a quartet of hammer dulcimer players.  Two of the four played the traditional hammer dulcimer, while the other two played baritone and treble hammer dulcimers specially designed by Rizzetta. The name of the band reflects the shape of the hammer dulcimer.  Since 1975, the group's membership and instrumentation has changed repeatedly, always with Paul Reisler as a member.  Their sound has been described as a "plinking and plunking, buzzing, sweeping, ringing, droning, and wailing acoustic construction" and as "a delightful musical melange" by the New York Times.

In 2004 and 2005, the 1984 lineup that recorded Winter Solstice with John McCutcheon - minus fiddler Freyda Epstein, who was killed in 2003 in a car accident - reunited with McCutcheon to perform acoustic concerts, called the Winter Solstice tour.

Reisler has gone on to form a new band, Paul Reisler and A Thousand Questions, and to form the Kid Pan Alley children's songwriting project.

Discography
Trapezoid (Traditional, 1975)
Three Forks of Cheat (Rounder, 1978)
Now and Then (Flying Fish, 1980) OCLC Number: 26137155; Lorraine Duisit, vocals, mandolin, mandola; Freyda Epstein, vocals, violin, viola; Ralph Gordon, vocals, bass, cello; Paul Reisier, guitar, hammer dulcimer. Includes The Lakes of Ponchartrain.
Another Country (Flying Fish, 1982) 
Cool of the Day (Sugar Hill, 1985) (Lorraine Duisit, Freyda Epstein, Ralph Gordon and Paul Reisler)
Moon Run (Narada/MCA, 1990)
Remembered Ways (Azure, 1994) Featuring Trapezoid; Paul Reisler, guitars and hammered dulcimer; Bobby Read, keyboards, winds, and percussion; Cecil Hooker, violin; Martha Sandefer, vocals, rhythm guitar and a bunch of Trapezoid's favorite musician friends including; Ysaye Barnwell, Howard Levy, Mike Auldridge, Lorraine Duisit, Peter Mark Prince and others.
Dissin’ the Diz with John McCutcheon (Azure, 1994)
Long Time Down This Road (Azure, 1995) A 20th anniversary retrospective featuring 65 minutes of music. Includes much music for hammered dulcimer including a dulcimer quartet and three previously unreleased songs. Featuring the haunting duet vocals of Lorraine Duisit and Freyda Epstein.

References

American folk musical groups
Hammered dulcimer players
Chamber jazz ensembles
Narada Productions artists